Niccolò (or Nicolò) Paganini (27 October 178227 May 1840) was an Italian violinist and composer. He was the most celebrated violin virtuoso of his time, and left his mark as one of the pillars of modern violin technique. His 24 Caprices for Solo Violin Op. 1 are among the best known of his compositions and have served as an inspiration for many prominent composers.

Biography

Childhood
Niccolò Paganini was born in Genoa (then capital of the Republic of Genoa) on 27 October 1782, the third of the six children of Antonio and Teresa (née Bocciardo) Paganini. Paganini's father was an unsuccessful trader, but he managed to supplement his income by playing music on the mandolin. At the age of five, Paganini started learning the mandolin from his father and moved to the violin by the age of seven. His musical talents were quickly recognized, earning him numerous scholarships for violin lessons. The young Paganini studied under various local violinists, including Giovanni Servetto and Giacomo Costa, but his progress quickly outpaced their abilities. Paganini and his father then traveled to Parma to seek further guidance from Alessandro Rolla. But upon listening to Paganini's playing, Rolla immediately referred him to his own teacher, Ferdinando Paer and, later, Paer's own teacher, Gasparo Ghiretti. Though Paganini did not stay long with Paer or Ghiretti, the two had considerable influence on his compositional style.

Early career
The French invaded northern Italy in March 1796, and Genoa was not spared. The Paganinis sought refuge in their country property in Romairone, near Bolzaneto. It was in this period that Paganini is thought to have developed his relationship with the guitar. He mastered the guitar, but preferred to play it in exclusively intimate, rather than public concerts. He later described the guitar as his "constant companion" on his concert tours. By 1800, Paganini and his father traveled to Livorno, where Paganini played in concerts and his father resumed his maritime work. In 1801, the 18-year-old Paganini was appointed first violin of the Republic of Lucca, but a substantial portion of his income came from freelancing. His fame as a violinist was matched only by his reputation as a gambler and womanizer.

In 1805, Lucca was annexed by Napoleonic France, and the region was ceded to Napoleon's sister, Elisa Baciocchi. Paganini became a violinist for the Baciocchi court, while giving private lessons to Elisa's husband, Felice. In 1807, Baciocchi became the Grand Duchess of Tuscany and her court was transferred to Florence. Paganini was part of the entourage, but, towards the end of 1809, he left Baciocchi to resume his freelance career.

Travelling virtuoso

For the next few years, Paganini returned to touring in the areas surrounding Parma and Genoa. Though he was very popular with the local audience, he was still not very well known in the rest of Europe. His first break came from an 1813 concert at La Scala in Milan. The concert was a great success. As a result, Paganini began to attract the attention of other prominent, though more conservative, musicians across Europe. His early encounters with Charles Philippe Lafont and Louis Spohr created intense rivalry. His concert activities, however, remained limited to Italy for the next few years.

In 1827, Pope Leo XII honoured Paganini with the Order of the Golden Spur. His fame spread across Europe with a concert tour that started in Vienna in August 1828, stopping in every major European city in Germany, Poland, and Bohemia until February 1831 in Strasbourg. This was followed by tours in Paris and Britain. His technical ability and his willingness to display it received much critical acclaim. In addition to his own compositions, theme and variations being the most popular, Paganini also performed modified versions of works (primarily concertos) written by his early contemporaries, such as Rodolphe Kreutzer and Giovanni Battista Viotti.

Paganini's travels also brought him into contact with eminent guitar virtuosi of the day, including Ferdinando Carulli in Paris and Mauro Giuliani in Vienna. But this experience did not inspire him to play public concerts with guitar, and even performances of his own guitar trios and quartets were private to the point of being behind closed doors.

Late career and health decline
Throughout his life, Paganini was no stranger to chronic illnesses. Although no definite medical proof exists, he was reputed to have been affected by Marfan syndrome or Ehlers–Danlos syndrome. In addition, his frequent concert schedule, as well as his extravagant lifestyle, took their toll on his health. He was diagnosed with syphilis as early as 1822, and his remedy, which included mercury and opium, came with serious physical and psychological side effects. In 1834, while still in Paris, he was treated for tuberculosis. Though his recovery was reasonably quick, after the illness his career was marred by frequent cancellations due to various health problems, from the common cold to depression, which lasted from days to months.

In September 1834, Paganini put an end to his concert career and returned to Genoa. Contrary to popular beliefs involving his wishing to keep his music and techniques secret, Paganini devoted his time to the publication of his compositions and violin methods. He accepted students, of whom two enjoyed moderate success: violinist Camillo Sivori and cellist Gaetano Ciandelli. Neither, however, considered Paganini helpful or inspirational. In 1835, Paganini returned to Parma, this time under the employ of Archduchess Marie Louise of Austria, Napoleon's second wife. He was in charge of reorganizing her court orchestra, but he eventually conflicted with the players and court, so his visions never saw completion. In Paris, he befriended the 11-year-old Polish virtuoso Apollinaire de Kontski, giving him some lessons and a signed testimonial. It was widely put about, falsely, that Paganini was so impressed with de Kontski's skills that he bequeathed him his violins and manuscripts.

Final years, death, and burial

In 1836, Paganini returned to Paris to set up a casino. Its immediate failure left him in financial ruin, and he auctioned off his personal effects, including his musical instruments, to recoup his losses. At Christmas of 1838, he left Paris for Marseille and, after a brief stay, travelled to Nice where his condition worsened. In May 1840, the Bishop of Nice sent Paganini a local parish priest to perform the last rites. Paganini assumed the sacrament was premature, and refused.

A week later, on 27 May 1840, the 57-year-old Paganini died from internal hemorrhaging before a priest could be summoned. Because of this, and his widely rumored association with the devil, the Church denied his body a Catholic burial in Genoa. It took four years and an appeal to the Pope before the Church let his body be transported to Genoa, but it was still not buried. His body was finally buried in 1876, in a cemetery in Parma. In 1893, the Czech violinist František Ondříček persuaded Paganini's grandson, Attila, to allow a viewing of the violinist's body. After this episode, Paganini's body was finally reinterred in a new cemetery in Parma in 1896.

Personal life

Though having no shortage of romantic conquests, Paganini was seriously involved with a singer named Antonia Bianchi from Como, whom he met in Milan in 1813. The two gave concerts together throughout Italy. They had a son, Achille Ciro Alessandro, born on 23 July 1825 in Palermo and baptized at San Bartolomeo's. They never legalized their union and it ended around April 1828 in Vienna. Paganini brought Achille on his European tours, and Achille later accompanied his father until the latter's death. He was instrumental in dealing with his father's burial, years after his death.

Throughout his career, Paganini also became close friends with composers Gioachino Rossini and Hector Berlioz. Rossini and Paganini met in Bologna in the summer of 1818. In January 1821, on his return from Naples, Paganini met Rossini again in Rome, just in time to become the substitute conductor for Rossini's opera Matilde di Shabran, upon the sudden death of the original conductor. Paganini's efforts earned great gratitude from Rossini.

Paganini met Berlioz in Paris in 1833 and they continued to correspond. He commissioned a piece from the composer, but was not satisfied with the resultant four-movement piece for orchestra and viola obbligato, Harold en Italie. He never performed it; instead, it was premiered a year later by violist Christian Urhan. He did, however, write his own Sonata per Gran Viola Op. 35 (with orchestra or guitar accompaniment). Despite his alleged lack of interest in Harold, Paganini often referred to Berlioz as the resurrection of Beethoven and, towards the end of his life, he gave large sums to the composer. They shared an active interest in the guitar, which they both played and used in compositions. Paganini gave Berlioz a guitar, which they both signed on its sound box.

Playing style

Instruments

Paganini was in possession of a number of fine stringed instruments. More legendary than these were the circumstances under which he obtained (and lost) some of them. While Paganini was still a teenager in Livorno, a wealthy businessman named Livron lent him a violin, made by the master luthier Giuseppe Guarneri, for a concert. Livron was so impressed with Paganini's playing that he refused to take it back. This particular violin came to be known as Il Cannone Guarnerius ("The Cannon of Guarnieri") because of its powerful voice and resonance. On a later occasion in Parma, he won another valuable violin (also by Guarneri) after a difficult sight-reading challenge from a man named Pasini.

Other instruments associated with Paganini include the Antonio Amati 1600, the Nicolò Amati 1657, the Paganini-Desaint 1680 Stradivari, the Guarneri-filius Andrea 1706, the Le Brun 1712 Stradivari, the Vuillaume c. 1720 Bergonzi, the Hubay 1726 Stradivari, and the Comte Cozio di Salabue 1727 violins; the Countess of Flanders 1582 da Salò-di Bertolotti, and the Mendelssohn 1731 Stradivari violas; the Piatti 1700 Goffriller, the Stanlein 1707 Stradivari, and the Ladenburg 1736 Stradivari cellos; and the Grobert of Mirecourt 1820 (guitar). Four of these instruments were played by the Tokyo String Quartet.

Of his guitars, there is little evidence remaining of his various choices of instrument. The aforementioned guitar that he gave to Berlioz is a French instrument made by one Grobert of Mirecourt. The luthier made his instrument in the style of René Lacôte, a more well-known Paris-based guitar-maker. It is preserved and on display in the Musée de la Musique in Paris.

Of the guitars he owned through his life, there was an instrument by Gennaro Fabricatore that he had refused to sell even in his periods of financial stress, and was among the instruments in his possession at the time of his death. There is an unsubstantiated rumour that he also played Stauffer guitars; he may certainly have come across these in his meetings with Giuliani in Vienna.

Violin technique

The Israeli violinist Ivry Gitlis once referred to Paganini as a phenomenon rather than a development. Though some of the techniques frequently employed by Paganini were already present, most accomplished violinists of the time focused on intonation and bowing techniques. Arcangelo Corelli (1653–1713) was considered a pioneer in transforming the violin from an ensemble instrument to a solo instrument. Other notable violinists included Antonio Vivaldi (1678–1741) and Giuseppe Tartini (1692–1770), who, in their compositions, reflected the increasing technical and musical demands on the violinist. Although the role of the violin in music drastically changed through this period, progress in violin technique was steady but slow. Techniques requiring agility of the fingers and the bow were still considered unorthodox and discouraged by the established community of violinists.

Much of Paganini's playing (and his violin composition) was influenced by two violinists, Pietro Locatelli (1693–1746) and August Duranowski (Auguste Frédéric Durand) (1770–1834). During Paganini's study in Parma, he came across the 24 Caprices of Locatelli (entitled L'arte di nuova modulazione – Capricci enigmatici or The art of the new style – the enigmatic caprices). Published in the 1730s, they were shunned by the musical authorities for their technical innovations, and were forgotten by the musical community at large. Around the same time, Durand, a former student of Giovanni Battista Viotti (1755–1824), became a celebrated violinist. He was renowned for his use of harmonics, both natural and artificial (which had previously not been attempted in performance), and the left hand pizzicato in his performance. Paganini was impressed by Durand's innovations and showmanship, which later also became the hallmarks of the young violin virtuoso. Paganini was instrumental in the revival and popularization of these violinistic techniques, which are now incorporated into regular compositions.

Another aspect of Paganini's violin techniques concerned his flexibility. He had exceptionally long fingers and was capable of playing three octaves across four strings in a hand span, an extraordinary feat even by today's standards. His seemingly unnatural ability may have been a result of Marfan syndrome.

Compositions

Paganini composed his own works to play exclusively in his concerts, all of which profoundly influenced the evolution of violin technique. His 24 Caprices were likely composed between 1805 and 1809, while he was in the service of the Baciocchi court. Also during this period, he composed the majority of the solo pieces, duo-sonatas, trios, and quartets for the guitar, either as a solo instrument or with strings. These chamber works may have been inspired by the publication, in Lucca, of the guitar quintets of Boccherini. Many of his variations, including Le Streghe, The Carnival of Venice, and Nel cor più non-mi sento, were composed, or at least first performed, before his European concert tour. His six violin concertos were written between 1817 and 1830.

Generally speaking, Paganini's compositions were technically imaginative, and the timbre of the instrument was greatly expanded as a result of these works. Sounds of different musical instruments and animals were often imitated. One such composition was titled Il Fandango Spanolo (The Spanish Dance), which featured a series of humorous imitations of farm animals. Even more outrageous was a solo piece Duetto Amoroso, in which the sighs and groans of lovers were intimately depicted on the violin. There survives a manuscript of the Duetto, which has been recorded. The existence of the Fandango is known only through concert posters.Eugène Ysaÿe criticized Paganini's works for lacking characteristics of true polyphonism. Yehudi Menuhin, on the other hand, suggested that this might have been the result of Paganini's reliance on the guitar (in lieu of the piano) as an aid in composition. The orchestral parts for his concertos were often polite, unadventurous, and clearly supportive of the soloist. In this, his style is consistent with that of other Italian composers such as Giovanni Paisiello, Gioachino Rossini, and Gaetano Donizetti, who were influenced by the guitar-song milieu of Naples during this period.

Paganini's "La Campanella" and the A minor Caprice (No. 24) have inspired many composers, including Franz Liszt, Robert Schumann, Johannes Brahms, Sergei Rachmaninoff, Boris Blacher, Andrew Lloyd Webber, George Rochberg, and Witold Lutosławski, all of whom wrote variations on these works.

Legacy and influence

Inspired works

Notable works inspired by compositions of Paganini include:
 Jason Becker – Caprice No. 5
 Mike Campese – "Paganini", arrangement of Caprice No. 16 and various works.
 Julián Carrillo – "6 Sonatas dedicadas a Paganini" for solo violin.
 Alfredo Casella – Paganiniana Op. 65 (1942)
 Mario Castelnuovo-Tedesco – Capriccio Diabolico for classical guitar is a homage to Paganini, and quotes "La campanella"
 Frédéric Chopin – Souvenir de Paganini for solo piano (1829; published posthumously)
 Ivry Gitlis – Cadenza for the 1st movement of Paganini's Violin Concerto No. 2 Op. 7 "La Campanella" (1967)
 Johann Nepomuk Hummel – Fantasia for piano in C major "Souvenir de Paganini", WoO 8, S. 190.
 Fritz Kreisler – Paganini Concerto in D major (recomposed paraphrase of the first movement of the Op. 6 Concerto) for violin and orchestra
 Franz Lehár – Paganini, a fictionalized operetta about Paganini (1925)
 Franz Liszt – Six Grandes Études de Paganini, S. 141 for solo piano (1851) (virtuoso arrangements of 5 caprices, including the 24th, and La Campanella from Violin Concerto No. 2)
 Yngwie Malmsteen – Paganini's Violin Concerto No. 4 is used in the opening of "Far Beyond the Sun" in Trial by Fire. Caprice No. 24 was used as a part of the solo in the song "Prophet of Doom" from the album War to End All Wars.
 Nathan Milstein – Paganiniana, a set of variations based on the theme from Paganini's 24th Caprice in which the variations are based on motifs from other caprices
 Cesare Pugni – "Le Carnaval de Venise" pas de deux (aka "Satanella" pas de deux). Based on airs from Paganini's Il carnevale di Venezia, op. 10. Originally choreographed by Marius Petipa as a concert piece for himself and the ballerina Amalia Ferraris. The pas de deux was later added to the ballet Satanella in 1866 where it acquired its more well-known title, the "Satanella" pas de deux.
 George Rochberg – Caprice Variations (1970), 50 variations for solo violin
 Michael Romeo – "Concerto in B Minor" is an adaptation of Allegro Maestoso (first movement) of Paganini's Violin Concerto No. 2 in B minor, Op. 7.
 Uli Jon Roth – "Scherzo alla Paganini" and "Paganini Paraphrase"
 Robert Schumann – Studies after Caprices by Paganini, Op. 3 (1832; piano); 6 Concert Studies on Caprices by Paganini, Op. 10 (1833, piano). A movement from his piano work Carnaval (Op. 9) is named for Paganini.
 Johann Sedlatzek (19th-century Polish flautist known as "The Paganini of the Flute") – "Souvenir à Paganini" Grand Variations on "The Carnival of Venice"
 Marilyn Shrude – Renewing the Myth for alto saxophone and piano
 Steve Vai – "Eugene's Trick Bag" from the movie Crossroads. Based on Caprice Nr. 5
 Philip Wilby – Paganini Variations for both wind band and brass band
 August Wilhelmj – Paganini Concerto in D major (recomposed paraphrase of the first movement of the Op. 6 Concerto) for violin and orchestra
 Eugène Ysaÿe – Paganini Variations for violin and piano
The Caprice No. 24 in A minor, Op. 1, (Tema con variazioni) has been the basis of works by many other composers. Notable examples include Brahms's Variations on a Theme of Paganini and Rachmaninoff's Rhapsody on a Theme of Paganini.

Memorials

The Paganini Competition (Premio Paganini) is an international violin competition created in 1954 in his home city of Genoa and named in his honour.

In 1972 the State of Italy purchased a large collection of Niccolò Paganini manuscripts from the W. Heyer Library of Cologne. They are housed at the Biblioteca Casanatense in Rome.

In 1982 the city of Genoa commissioned a thematic catalogue of music by Paganini, edited by Maria Rosa Moretti and Anna Sorrento, hence the abbreviation "MS" assigned to his catalogued works.

A minor planet 2859 Paganini discovered in 1978 by Soviet astronomer Nikolai Chernykh is named after him.

Fiorini daguerreotype 
Although no photographs of Paganini are known to exist, in 1900 Italian violin maker Giuseppe Fiorini forged the now famous fake daguerreotype of the celebrated violinist. So well in fact, that even the great classical author and conversationalist Arthur M. Abell was led to believe it to be true, reprinting the image in the 22 January 1901 issue of the Musical Courier.

Dramatic portrayals

Paganini has been portrayed by a number of actors in film and television productions, including Stewart Granger in the 1946 biographical portrait The Magic Bow, Roxy Roth in A Song to Remember (1945), Klaus Kinski in Kinski Paganini (1989), and David Garrett in The Devil's Violinist (2013).

In the Soviet 1982 miniseries Niccolo Paganini, the musician was portrayed by the Armenian actor Vladimir Msryan. The series focuses on Paganini's relationship with the Roman Catholic Church. Another Soviet actor, Armen Dzhigarkhanyan, played Paganini's fictionalized arch-rival, an insidious Jesuit official. The information in the series is generally spurious, and it also plays to some of the myths and legends rampant during the musician's lifetime. One memorable scene shows Paganini's adversaries sabotaging his violin before a high-profile performance, causing all strings but one to break during the concert. An undeterred Paganini continues to perform on three, two, and finally on a single string. In actuality, Paganini himself occasionally broke strings during his performances on purpose so he could further display his virtuosity. He did this by carefully filing notches into them to weaken them, so that they would break when in use.

In Don Nigro's satirical comedy play Paganini (1995), the great violinist seeks vainly for his salvation, claiming that he unknowingly sold his soul to the Devil. "Variation upon variation," he cries at one point, "but which variation leads to salvation and which to damnation? Music is a question for which there is no answer." Paganini is portrayed as having killed three of his lovers and sinking repeatedly into poverty, prison, and drink. Each time he is "rescued" by the Devil, who appears in different guises, returning Paganini's violin so he can continue playing. In the end, Paganini's salvation—administered by a god-like Clockmaker—turns out to be imprisonment in a large bottle where he plays his music for the amusement of the public through all eternity. "Do not pity him, my dear," the Clockmaker tells Antonia, one of Paganini's murdered wives. "He is alone with the answer for which there is no question. The saved and the damned are the same."

References

Bibliography
 Angelo Boscassi, Il Violino di Niccolò Paganini conservato nel Palazzo Municipale di Genova, Fratelli Pagano, 1909
 Leopold Auer, Violin playing as I teach it, Stokes, 1921 (reprint Dover, 1980)
 Alberto Bachmann, An Encyclopedia of the violin, Da Capo, 1925
 Jeffrey Pulver, Paganini: The Romantic Virtuoso, Herbert Joseph, 1936 (reprint Da Capo, 1970)
 Geraldine I.C. de Courcy, Paganini the Genoese, University of Oklahoma, 1957 (reprint Da Capo, 1977)
 Yehudi Menuhin and William Primrose, Violin and viola, MacDonald and Jane's, 1976
 Yehudi Menuhin and Curtis W. Davis, The Music of man, Methuen, 1979
 John Sugden, Paganini, Omnibus Press, 1980
 Philippe Borer, The Twenty-Four Caprices of Niccolò Paganini. Their significance for the history of violin playing and the music of the Romantic era, Zurich, 1997
 Bruno Monsaingeon,The Art of violin, NVC Arts (on film), 2001
 Masters of the Nineteenth Century Guitar, Mel Bay Publications
 Philippe Borer, "Some reflections on Paganini's violin strings", in: Proceedings of the international conference Restoration and Conservation of the Guarneri del Gesù known as Cannone, Genoa, 2004 http://www.silkqin.com/03qobj/strings/pagstrings.pdf
 Danilo Prefumo, Niccolò Paganini, L'Epos, 2006, 
 Tatiana Berford, Николо Паганини: стилевые истоки творчества [=The stylistic sources of Niccolò Paganini's work], Saint Petersburg, Novikova, 2010

External links

 
 Viola in music – Niccolò Paganini
 Nicolo Paganini Discography: Exhaustive list of recordings (coarse- and micro-groove records, CD, SACD, VHS & DVD) arranged under 12 instrumental sections; includes index of artists, selected album covers & detailed composition list 
 
 Paganini in London (Royal Academy of Music)

Images
 Images of Paganini (Gallica)

 
1782 births
1840 deaths
19th-century classical composers
19th-century classical violinists
19th-century Italian male musicians
Articles containing video clips
Chamber virtuosi of the Emperor of Austria
Composers for the classical guitar
Composers for violin
Italian classical composers
Italian classical violinists
Italian male classical composers
Italian Romantic composers
Male classical violinists
Musicians from Genoa
Musicians from Parma
String quartet composers
Italian Freemasons
Deal with the Devil